Greg Kern (born 14 July 1963) is a Canadian former soccer player who played at both the professional and international levels as a defender.

Career
Born in Calgary, Alberta, Kern signed with the Montreal Manic of the North American Soccer League in the fall of 1981.  He would play one indoor and two outdoor seasons with the Manic.  In 1985, he played for the Victoria Riptides of the 1985 Western Alliance Challenge Series. In 1986, he joined the Calgary Kickers of the Canadian Soccer League where he was a 1987 First Team All Star. The next year he moved to the Edmonton Brick Men. He also played at full international level for Canada, earning twelve caps between 1986 and 1988.

In 2018, he was appointed as the executive director of Red Deer City Soccer Association.

References

External links
 NASL stats
 
 

1963 births
Living people
Soccer players from Calgary
Calgary Kickers players
Canada men's international soccer players
Canadian Soccer League (1987–1992) players
Canadian soccer players
Association football defenders
North American Soccer League (1968–1984) players
North American Soccer League (1968–1984) indoor players
Montreal Manic players
Victoria Riptides players
Western Soccer Alliance players
Edmonton Brick Men players